3Friends Racing, doing business as 3F Racing, is a German stock car racing team that will debut in NASCAR and ARCA starting in 2023. They plan to compete part-time in the NASCAR Cup Series, fielding the No. 30 Chevrolet Camaro ZL1. They also hope to compete part-time in the ARCA Menards Series, fielding an entry for Christopher Tate. The team was founded by German entrepreneurs, Dennis Hirtz and Paul Wiedeler, and is believed to be the first German-owned team in NASCAR history. 3F Racing will also have a technical alliance with Richard Childress Racing and have their shop on RCR's campus in Welcome, North Carolina.

History

NASCAR Cup Series

Car No. 30 history
The team had announced their plans on July 18, 2022, but was not widely known about until August 3, 2022 when a NASCAR Reddit user discovered the team. The team's initial plans were to run the final five races of the 2022 season, starting with the Bank of America Roval 400. Hirtz stated that "Our driver for the Roval will be a two time 24 Hours of Le Mans winner with a strong European background, and for the remaining races we will field a very experienced and well known US American NASCAR driver." The team did not announce their drivers and sponsors for 2022 in their initial announcement. Many fans speculated that Justin Allgaier would be the driver for the oval tracks as he was a follower of the team on social media when they were first discovered. Fans also speculated that Earl Bamber would be the driver for the Roval since he has extensive sports car racing experience in Europe, including two 24 Hours of Le Mans wins (matching Hirtz's description), and he has made a NASCAR start previously (the 2020 Xfinity Series race at the Daytona Road Course).

On October 6, Hirtz told TobyChristie.com that the team would be delaying their debut until 2023. He stated that the team plans to run ten Cup Series races in 2023 with hopes to run full-time in 2024.

NASCAR Truck Series
On August 4, 2022, late model driver Christopher Tate announced on Twitter that he would hopefully make his NASCAR Truck Series debut for the team. The number and sponsor have yet to be announced.

ARCA Menards Series
On August 4, 2022, along with the Truck Series announcement, Tate would also announce that he would make his ARCA Menards Series debut for the team. The number and sponsor have yet to be announced.

References

External links
 

NASCAR teams
German auto racing teams
Auto racing teams established in 2022